Queer anarchism, or anarcha-queer, is an anarchist school of thought that advocates anarchism and social revolution as a means of queer liberation and abolition of hierarchies such as homophobia, lesbophobia, transmisogyny, biphobia, transphobia, heteronormativity, patriarchy, and the gender binary.  People who campaigned for LGBT rights both outside and inside the anarchist and LGBT movements include John Henry Mackay, Lucía Sánchez Saornil, Adolf Brand and Daniel Guérin. Individualist anarchist Adolf Brand published Der Eigene from 1896 to 1932 in Berlin, the first sustained journal dedicated to gay issues.

History

Early history 

Anarchism's foregrounding of individual freedoms made for a natural defense of homosexuality in the eyes of many, both inside and outside of the anarchist movement. In  (1923), Emil Szittya wrote about homosexuality that "very many anarchists have this tendency. Thus I found in Paris a Hungarian anarchist, Alexander Sommi, who founded a homosexual anarchist group on the basis of this idea". His view is confirmed by Magnus Hirschfeld in his 1914 book : "In the ranks of a relatively small party, the anarchist, it seemed to me as if proportionately more homosexuals and effeminates are found than in others". Italian anarchist Luigi Bertoni (who Szittya also believed to be homosexual) observed: "Anarchists demand freedom in everything, thus also in sexuality. Homosexuality leads to a healthy sense of egoism, for which every anarchist should strive".

Anarcho-syndicalist writer Ulrich Linse wrote about "a sharply outlined figure of the Berlin individualist anarchist cultural scene around 1900", the "precocious Johannes Holzmann" (known as Senna Hoy): "an adherent of free love, [Hoy] celebrated homosexuality as a 'champion of culture' and engaged in the struggle against Paragraph 175". The young Hoy (born 1882) published these views in his weekly magazine  (Struggle) from 1904, which reached a circulation of 10,000 the following year. He decided to devote himself entirely to writing and political activism from an anarchist standpoint. In 1904, he published the booklet "Das dritte Geschlecht" ("The Third Gender"). In it, he attacked homophobia, laying most of the blame on religion. Above all, the text was intended to be educational and covered evolution, biology and issues facing homosexuals at the time. From 1904 to 1905, Holzmann edited the journal Der Kampf: Zeitschrift für gesunden Menschenverstand (The Struggle: Journal for Common Sense). Though it was not published by any particular organization, the journal was anarchist in outlook. In addition to fictional stories, Der Kampf published articles on various topics, including many about homosexuality. Among its writers were Else Lasker-Schüler, Peter Hille, and Erich Mühsam and, at its best, it had a circulation of up to 10,000. During this time, Holzmann wrote the article "Die Homosexualität als Kulturbewegung" ("Homosexuality as a Cultural Movement"). He argued that the right to privacy entailed that "no one has the right to intrude in the private matters of another, to meddle in another's personal views and orientations, and that ultimately it is no one's business what two freely consenting adults do in their homes." He attacked Paragraph 175 of the German criminal code which criminalized homosexual acts.

German anarchist psychotherapist Otto Gross also wrote extensively about same-sex sexuality in both men and women and argued against its discrimination. Heterosexual anarchist Robert Reitzel (1849–1898) spoke positively of homosexuality from the beginning of the 1890s in his German-language journal Der arme Teufel (Detroit).

John Henry Mackay was an individualist anarchist known in the anarchist movement as an important early follower and propagandizer of the philosophy of Max Stirner. Alongside this, Mackay was also an early signer of Magnus Hirschfeld's "Petition to the Legislative Bodies of the German Empire" for "a revision of the anti-homosexual paragraph 175 (his name appeared in the first list published in 1899)". He also kept a special interest about Oscar Wilde and was outraged at his imprisonment for homosexual activity. Nevertheless, Mackay entered into conflict with Hirschfeld and his organization the Scientific Humanitarian Committee.

The individualist anarchist Adolf Brand was originally a member of Hirschfeld's Scientific Humanitarian Committee, but formed a break-away group. Brand and his colleagues, known as the Gemeinschaft der Eigenen ("Community of Self-owners"), were also heavily influenced by the writings of Stirner. They were opposed to Hirschfeld's medical characterization of homosexuality as the domain of an "intermediate sex". Ewald Tschek, another homosexual anarchist writer of the era, regularly contributed to Adolf Brand's journal  and wrote in 1925 that Hirschfeld's Scientific Humanitarian Committee was a danger to the German people, caricaturing Hirschfeld as "Dr. Feldhirsch". Although Mackay was closer in views to Brand and his "Community of Self-owners" in some respects as compared to Hirschfeld's Scientific Humanitarian Committee, nevertheless he did not agree with Brand's antifeminism and almost misogynistic views believing his "anarchist principle of equal freedom to all certainly applied to women as well as men".

 was the first gay journal in the world, published from 1896 to 1932 by Brand in Berlin. Brand contributed many poems and articles himself. Other contributors included Benedict Friedlaender, Hanns Heinz Ewers, Erich Mühsam, Kurt Hiller, Ernst Burchard, John Henry Mackay, Theodor Lessing, Klaus Mann and Thomas Mann as well as artists Wilhelm von Gloeden, Fidus and Sascha Schneider. After the rise to power by the Nazis, Brand became a victim of persecution and had his journal closed.

The Ukrainian anarchist military leader Nestor Makhno was known to employ disguises as part of his guerilla tactics. His most commonly assumed disguise involved putting on makeup and dressing as a woman, so that he could survey enemy positions without detection.

The prominent American anarchist Emma Goldman was also an outspoken critic of prejudice against homosexuals. Her belief that social liberation should extend to gay men and lesbians was virtually unheard of at the time, even among anarchists. As Magnus Hirschfeld wrote, "she was the first and only woman, indeed the first and only American, to take up the defense of homosexual love before the general public". In numerous speeches and letters, she defended the right of gay men and lesbians to love as they pleased and condemned the fear and stigma associated with homosexuality. As Goldman wrote in a letter to Hirschfeld: "It is a tragedy, I feel, that people of a different sexual type are caught in a world which shows so little understanding for homosexuals and is so crassly indifferent to the various gradations and variations of gender and their great significance in life".

Despite these supportive stances, the anarchist movement of the time certainly was not free of homophobia and an editorial in an influential Spanish anarchist journal from 1935 argued that an anarchist should not even associate with homosexuals, let alone be one: "If you are an anarchist, that means that you are more morally upright and physically strong than the average man. And he who likes inverts is no real man, and is therefore no real anarchist".

Lucía Sánchez Saornil was a main founder of the Spanish anarcha-feminist federation Mujeres Libres who was open about being a lesbian. At a young age, she began writing poetry and associated herself with the emerging Ultraist literary movement. By 1919, she had been published in a variety of journals, including Los Quijotes, Tableros, Plural, Manantial and La Gaceta Literaria. Working under a male pen name, she was able to explore lesbian themes at a time when homosexuality was criminalized and subject to censorship and punishment. 

The writings of the French bisexual anarchist Daniel Guérin offer an insight into the tension sexual minorities among the left have often felt. He was a leading figure in the French left from the 1930s until his death in 1988. After coming out in 1965, he spoke about the extreme hostility toward homosexuality that permeated the left throughout much of the 20th century. "Not so many years ago, to declare oneself a revolutionary and to confess to being homosexual were incompatible", Guérin wrote in 1975.

In 1954, Guérin was widely attacked for his study of the Kinsey Reports in which he also detailed the oppression of homosexuals in France: "The harshest [criticisms] came from Marxists, who tend seriously to underestimate the form of oppression which is antisexual terrorism. I expected it, of course, and I knew that in publishing my book I was running the risk of being attacked by those to whom I feel closest on a political level". After coming out publicly in 1965, Guérin was abandoned by the left and his papers on sexual liberation were censored or refused publication in left-wing journals.

Guérin moved away from Marxism–Leninism and toward a synthesis of anarchism and Marxism close to platformism, which allowed for individualism while rejecting capitalism, who would eventually embrace anarcho-communism. Guérin was involved in the uprising of May 1968 and was a part of the French gay liberation movement that emerged after the events. Decades later, Frédéric Martel described Guérin as the "grandfather of the French homosexual movement".

In the United States, the influential anarchist thinker Paul Goodman came out late in his career as bisexual. The freedom with which he revealed in print and in public his romantic and sexual relations with men (notably in a late essay, "Being Queer"), proved to be one of the many important cultural springboards for the emerging gay liberation movement of the early 1970s.

Contemporary history 

The early gay liberation movement shared many theoretical foundations and philosophies with anarchist movements in the mid twentieth century. Chants such as "2-4-6-8, smash the church, smash the state!" were popular around the time of the Stonewall riots, setting the tone for a queer rights movement grounded in anarchist thought. The two campaigns both focus on rejecting normative thinking and the state in favor of personal liberty and pleasure.

Anarchism and queer theory both reject paternalistic state structures that depend on capitalism and the nuclear family. Instead, both favor forms of self-determination and the reordering of society. An example of anarchism and queerness intersecting can be found in those who engage in non-monogamous relationships, these are inherently anarchical, as they are rejecting traditional power structures that shape the nuclear family. This concept has been coined Relationship Anarchism.

Anarcha-queer originated during the second half of the 20th century among anarchists involved in the gay liberation movement, who viewed anarchism as the road to harmony between heterosexual/cis people and LGBT people. Anarcha-queer has its roots deep in queercore, a form of punk rock that portrays homosexuality in a positive manner. Like most forms of punk rock, queercore attracts a large anarchist crowd. Anarchists are prominent in queercore zines. Queer Fist appeared in New York City and identifies itself as "an anti-assimilationist, anti-capitalist, anti-authoritarian street action group, came together to provide direct action and a radical queer and trans-identified voice at the Republican National Convention (RNC) protests".

Activism 

Queer anarchists have been active in protesting and activism, using direct action against what is seen as homonormative consumerism and pink capitalism. Queer anarchists have set up squats and autonomous zones as well as urban communities for the queer and LGBT community. Rural communities often rely on social media to grow anarchist movements and networks, due to these communities being geographically isolated from urban centers. Social networking sites facilitate knowledge transmission that provides alternative ideals to people in rural populations that were previously only available to urban dwellers.

Many queer anarchists embrace the notion of radical individualism, influenced by individual  philosophers like Max Stirner. Organizations like ACT-Up a punk anti-racist, anti-fascist organization and supported and composed of queer anarchists organization that has supported queer radicals and direct action. Later during the WTO protests queer anarchists played a vital role in organizing the mass protests, the protests would lead to the explosion of the anti-globalization movement.

In popular culture 

"Be gay, do crime" is a slogan popular in contemporary Pride parades, LGBT-related protests, and graffiti. In 2018, it was popularised on Twitter by a meme created by Io Ascarium of the ABO Comix collective, which sells comics made by other abled LGBTQ+ prisoners. Ascarium describes the phrase as coming "from the communal grab-bag of anti-assimilationist queer slogans. Like 'ACAB' or 'Stonewall was a Riot' it was pulled from the chaotic ether, originated nowhere and belongs to nobody," though Google Trends suggests interest has existed since at least 2011. The "memeification" of the "be gay do crime" slogan is an example of increased accessibility into anarchist schools of thought.

The slogan "Be gay, do crime" is an anti-capitalistic and anti-authoritarian statement, implying that crime and incivility may be necessary to earn equal rights given the criminalization of homosexuality around the world and that the Stonewall uprising was a riot. Within the anarchist space, the Mary Nardini Gang reflected on their manifesto Toward the Queerest Insurrection with the book Be Gay Do Crime, where they affirm "the reality and the continuity of a culture and a history of experiencing outlawness, illegality, and lack of citizenship." Mark Bieschke, a curator at the GLBT History Museum, claimed that the slogan is meant to stand against the "polished, corporate narrative of Pride".

American cartooning publication The Nib compiled Be Gay, Do Comics, an anthology of short comics "featuring queer history, memoir, and satire", launched on the crowdfunding platform Kickstarter in November 2019, and later published for mainstream distribution in September 2020. In the book's foreword, Nib co-editor Matt Lubchansky explained the title as an homage to Ascarium's meme, interpreting it as a reminder that “Queerness has always been transgressive, regardless of its legal status.”

See also 

 Anarchism and issues related to love and sex
 Relationship anarchy
 Communism and homosexuality
 DUMBA – a New York collective living space with Anarcha-queer tendencies
 Gay Shame – a movement self-described as a radical alternative to gay mainstreaming
 Pink capitalism
 Queeruption – a queercore festival where anarchists are prominent
 Socialism and LGBT rights

References

Bibliography

Further reading 
 Lena Eckert. "Post-Anarchism as a Tool for Queer and Transgender Politics and/or Vice Versa?". 1993
 David Berry. For a dialectic of homosexuality and revolution. 2003.
 Terence Kissack. Free Comrades: Anarchism and Homosexuality in the United States. AK Press. 2008.  
 Fray Baroque & Tegan Eanell (Eds). Queer Ultraviolence: BashBack! Anthology. Ardent Press. 2011
 C. B. Daring, J. Rogue, Deric Shannon and Abbey Volcano(Eds). Queering Anarchism. AK Press. 2012
 The Mary Nardini Gang. Be Gay Do Crime. Contagion Press. 2018
 Vikky Storm. The Gender Accelerationist Manifesto. 2019

External links 
 
 Archive of queer zines

 
Anarchism and free love
Anarchist schools of thought
Issues in anarchism
LGBT rights